Hexaspiron is a genus of worms belonging to the family Neoechinorhynchidae.

Species:

Hexaspiron nigericum 
Hexaspiron parabramis 
Hexaspiron spinibarbi

References

Neoechinorhynchidae
Acanthocephala genera